Actia rufescens is a species of tachinid flies in the genus Actia of the family Tachinidae.

Distribution
Québec, North Dakota, South Dakota, Iowa, Illinois, Michigan, Ohio.

References

Diptera of North America
rufescens
Insects described in 1934